The 2001–02 VfL Bochum season was the 64th season in club history.

Review and events
The VfL Bochum encountered some difficulties signing a new head coach. Bernard Dietz, the head coach of the clubs reserve team, took over as caretaker and served double duty until Peter Neururer was signed on 4 December 2001.

Matches

Legend

2. Bundesliga

DFB-Pokal

Squad

Squad and statistics

Squad, appearances and goals scored

Transfers

Summer

In:

Out:

Winter

In:

Out:

VfL Bochum II

Sources

External links
 2001–02 VfL Bochum season at Weltfussball.de 
 2001–02 VfL Bochum season at kicker.de 
 2001–02 VfL Bochum season at Fussballdaten.de 

Bochum
VfL Bochum seasons